A society with a high level of water security makes the most of water's benefits for humans and ecosystems, and limits the risk of destructive impacts associated with water. The risks include too much water (flood), too little water (drought and water scarcity) or poor quality (polluted) water. A more detailed definition of water security is: "the reliable availability of an acceptable quantity and quality of water for health, livelihoods and production, coupled with an acceptable level of water-related risks". Access to WASH services (water, sanitation and hygiene) is one component of achieving water security. Some organizations use the term water security more narrowly for water supply aspects only.  

Policy-makers and water managers seek to achieve water security outcomes that address economic, environmental and social equity concerns. These outcomes can include increasing economic welfare, enhancing social equity and reducing water related risks. There are interactions and trade-offs between the different outcomes. Planners often consider water security outcomes for different groups in society also during the design of climate change adaptation strategies.   

Three main factors determine how difficult or easy it is for a society to sustain its water security: the hydrologic environment, the socio-economic environment and changes in the future environment (mainly due to climate change). Policy-makers and water managers usually manage water security risks at different spatial scales: from within the household to community, city, basin, country and region.  

The absence of water security is water insecurity. Water insecurity is a growing threat to societies. The main factors contributing to water insecurity include water scarcity, water pollution, reduced water quality due to climate change impacts, poverty, destructive forces of water, and natural disasters. Climate change affects water security in multiple ways. Changing rainfall patterns, and specifically droughts, can have significant impact on water availability. Quality of water is worsened by flooding events, for instance. Stronger storms can damage infrastructure, especially in the Global South, which is more vulnerable to this type of damage.

There are different approaches to tackle water insecurity. Science and engineering approaches can increase the water supply or make water use more efficient. Financial and economic tools can include a safety net to ensure access for poorer people. Finally, management and political tools, such as demand caps, can improve water security too. They work on strengthening institutions and information flows, improving water quality management, reducing inequalities and investing in water infrastructure. Improving the climate resilience of water and sanitation services is also important. These efforts also help to achieve sustainable development and poverty reduction.

There is no single method to measure water security. Metrics of water security roughly fall into two categories: those that are based on experiences versus metrics that are based on resources. The former mainly focus on measuring the water experiences of households and human well-being, while the latter tend to focus on freshwater availability or water resources security.

Definitions

Broad definition 
The term water security is often used with varying definitions. It emerged as a concept in the 21st century and is a broader concept than the absence of water scarcity. Unlike food security and energy security (which refer to reliable access to food or energy), water security is not only about the absence of water but also its presence when there is too much of it. 

Water security can be defined as "the reliable availability of an acceptable quantity and quality of water for health, livelihoods and production, coupled with an acceptable level of water-related risks". 

A similar definition of water security by UN-Water is: "the capacity of a population to safeguard sustainable access to adequate quantities of acceptable quality water for sustaining livelihoods, human well-being, and socio-economic development, for ensuring protection against water-borne pollution and water-related disasters, and for preserving ecosystems in a climate of peace and political stability."

World Resources Institute also proposed a similar definition in 2020: "For purposes of this report, we define water security as the capacity of a population to

 safeguard sustainable access to adequate quantities of acceptable quality water for sustaining livelihoods, human well-being, and socioeconomic development;
 protect against water pollution and water-related disasters; and
 preserve ecosystems, upon which clean water availability and other ecosystem services depend."

Narrower definition with a focus on water supply 
Some organizations use water security in a more specific sense to refer to water supply only, without considering the water-related risks of too much water. For example, the definition of WaterAid in 2012 focuses on water supply issues: Water security is "reliable access to water of sufficient quantity and quality for basic human needs, small-scale livelihoods and local ecosystem services, coupled with a well managed risk of water-related disasters". The World Water Council also uses this more specific approach with a focus on water supply: "Water security refers to the availability of water, in adequate quantity and quality, to sustain all these needs together (social and economic sectors, as well as the larger needs of the planet’s ecosystems) – without exceeding its ability to renew."

Relationship with WASH and IWRM 
Access to WASH (water, sanitation and hygiene) services is one component of achieving water security. The relationship works in both ways: to be sustainable, WASH services also address water security issues. For example: WASH relies on water resources that are part of the water cycle. But climate change has many impacts on the water cycle which can threaten water security. Furthermore, there is growing competition for water which reduces the availability of water resources in many areas in the world.

Water security incorporates ideas and concepts related to the sustainability, integration and adaptiveness of water resource management. Terms such as integrated water resources management (IWRM) or sustainable water management are predecessors.

Related concepts

Water risk 
Water risk refers to the "possibility of an entity experiencing a water-related challenge (e.g., water scarcity, water stress, flooding, infrastructure decay, drought)". Water risk is inversely related to water security, meaning that as water risk increases, water security decreases. Water risk is complex and multidimensional. It includes risks from natural and human-made disasters such as flooding and drought, which can lead to infrastructure failure and worsen hunger. When these disasters take place, they result in water scarcity or other problems. The potential economic effects of water risk are significant. Water risks threaten entire industries, such as the food and beverage, agriculture, oil and gas, utilities, semiconductor manufacturing. Agriculture uses 69% of global freshwater, making the industry very vulnerable to water stress.

Risk is a combination of hazard (droughts, floods and quality deterioration), exposure and vulnerability. Bad infrastructure and bad governance result in high vulnerability. 

The financial sector is becoming more aware of the potential impacts of water risk and the need for its proper management. By 2025, water risk will threaten $145 trillion in assets under management.

To help mitigate water risk, companies can develop water risk management plans. Stakeholders within financial markets can then use these plans to measure company environmental, social and governance (ESG) performance and identify leaders in water risk management. The World Resources Institute has also developed an online water data platform named Aqueduct for risk assessment and water management. China Water Risk is a nonprofit dedicated to understanding and managing water risk in China. The World Wildlife Fund has a Water Risk Filter that helps companies assess and respond to water risk with scenarios for 2030 and 2050. The World Wildlife Fund has also partnered with DWS, which provides business solutions to water risk including water-centric investment funds.

The concept of risk is part of water security policy but more integration with social equity considerations is necessary.

There is no unifying theory or mathematical model for determining or managing water risk. Instead, managers use a range of theories, models and technologies to understand the trade-offs that exist in responding to risk.

Water conflict

Desired outcomes 
There are three groups of water security outcomes: economic, environmental and equity (or social) outcomes. Outcomes are things that are happening, or that we want to see happen, as a result of policy and management:   

 Economic outcomes: Sustainable growth (e.g. job creation, increased productivity and standards of living) which takes changing water needs and threats into account. 

 Environmental outcomes: quality and availability of water for the ecosystems services that depend on this water resource. Loss of freshwater biodiversity and depletion of groundwater are examples of negative environmental outcomes.
 Equity or social outcomes: Inclusive services so that different users (people, industry, agriculture) are able to access safe, reliable, sufficient and affordable water, and to dispose of wastewater safely. Aspects of interest include gender issues, empowerment, participation and accountability.

There are four different focus areas for water security and its outcomes: it is about using water such that we are increasing economic welfare, enhancing social equity, moving towards long-term sustainability or reducing water-related risks. Policy-makers and water managers must consider interactions and trade-offs between the different types of outcome.

Improving water security is a key factor to achieve growth, sustainable development and poverty reduction. Water security is also about social justice and fair distribution of environmental benefits and harms. Sustainable development would result in lowered poverty and increased living standards for those most susceptible to the impacts of insecure water resources in the region, especially women and children.

Water security is important for meeting most of the 17 United Nations Sustainable Development Goals (SDGs) because access to adequate and safe water is a precondition for meeting many of the individual goals. It is also important for climate-resilient development. Planners consider water security outcomes for different groups in society during the design of climate change adaptation strategies.

Determining factors 
Three main factors determine a society's ability to sustain water security:

 Hydrologic environment
 Socio-economic environment
 Changes in the future environment (climate change)

Hydrologic environment 
The hydrologic environment is important for water security. The term hydrologic environment refers to the "absolute level of water resource availability" but also how much it varies in time (inter-annual means from one year to the next, intra-annual means from one season to the next) and in location (this is called spatial distribution). Scholars distinguish between a hydrologic environment that is easy to manage and one that is difficult to manage.

An easy to manage hydrologic environment would be one with low rainfall variability, with rain distributed throughout the year and perennial river flows sustained by groundwater base flows. For example, many of the world’s industrialized nations have a hydrologic environment that they can manage quite easily. This has helped them to achieve water security early in their development path.

A difficult to manage hydrologic environment is one with absolute water scarcity (i.e. deserts) or low-lying lands where there is severe flood risk. Regions where rainfall is very variable from one season to the next, or regions where rainfall varies a lot from one year to the next (called high inter-annual climate variability) are also likely to face water security challenges. An example would be East Africa, where prolonged drought have happened every two to three years since 1999. Most of the world’s developing countries have difficult to manage hydrologies and have not achieved water security - which is not a coincidence.

The poverty and hydrology hypothesis states that poverty and difficult hydrologies are related. It postulates that regions with a difficult hydrology (for example rainfall variability within one year and across several years) remain poor because the respective governments have not been able to make the large investments needed to achieve water security. The resulting water insecurity constrains economic growth. Greater rainfall variability is "statistically associated with lower per capita incomes".

Socio-economic environment 
The socio-economic environment also determines the potential of a society to sustain water security. This refers the structure of the economy, behavior of its actors, natural and cultural legacies as well as policy choices. It also includes water infrastructure and institutions, macroeconomic structure and resilience, risk and the behavior of economic actors.

Climate change 

Water-related impacts from climate change impact people's water security on a day-to-day basis. They include: "increased frequency and intensity of heavy precipitation; accelerated melting of glaciers; changes in frequency, size and timing of floods; more frequent and severe droughts in some places; decline in groundwater storage, and reduction in groundwater recharge and water quality deterioration due to extreme events". Climate change affects water resources in various ways. The total amount of freshwater that is available can change, for instance due to dry spells or droughts. The water quality might also get worse due to the effects of climate change.

Global climate change is "likely to increase the complexity and costs of ensuring water security". It creates new threats and adaptation challenges. This is because climate change leads to increased hydrological variability and extremes. Climate change has many impacts on the water cycle, resulting in higher climatic and hydrological variability, which can threaten water security. Changes in the water cycle threaten existing and future water infrastructure. It will be harder to plan investments for future water infrastructure as there are so many uncertainties about future variability for the water cycle. This makes societies more vulnerable to extreme water-related events and therefore reduces water security.

Climate change is about uncertainty and is an important long-term risk to water security. On the other hand, future climate change is only one of many existing challenges for water security which include: existing high levels of climate variability at low latitudes, population growth, increased demand for water resources, political obstacles, increased disaster exposure due to settlement of hazard-prone areas, and environmental degradation. Water demand for irrigation in agriculture will increase due to climate change. This is because evaporation rates and crop transpiration rates will be higher due to rising temperatures.

Climate factors are a major driver of water security across different scales. Geographic variability in water availability, reliability of rainfall and vulnerability to droughts, floods and cyclones are inherent hazards that affect development opportunities and that play out at international to intra-basin scales. At local scales, social vulnerability is a factor that increases the risks to water security, no matter what the cause is. For example, people affected by poverty may have less ability to cope with climate shocks.

Challenges and threats 
There are many factors that contribute to low water security, for example:  

 Water scarcity: Water demand exceeds supply in many regions of the world. This can be due to population growth, higher living standards, general economic expansion and/or greater quantities of water used in agriculture for irrigation. 
 Increasing water pollution and low levels of wastewater treatment, which is making local water unusable.
 Poor planning of water use, poor water management and misuse (causing groundwater levels to drop, rivers and lakes to dry out, and local ecosystems to collapse).
 Trans-boundary waters and international rivers which belong to several countries (country borders often do not align with natural watersheds e.g. due to borders drawn during 20th century colonialism).
 Climate change (increasing frequency and intensity of water-related natural disasters, such as droughts and floods; rising temperatures and sea levels can lead to contamination of freshwater sources).

Water scarcity 
An important threat to water security is water scarcity. About 27% of the world's population lived in areas affected by water scarcity in the mid-2010s. This number will likely increase to 42% by 2050.

Water pollution 
Water pollution is a threat to water security as it can affect drinking water supplies and indirectly contribute to water scarcity.

Reduced water quality due to climate change 

Weather and weather-related shocks can affect water quality in several ways depending on the local climate and context. Weather-related shocks include water shortages, heavy rain and temperature extremes. They can cause damage to water infrastructure from erosion under heavy rainfall and floods, loss of water sources in droughts, and deterioration of water quality. 

Climate change can cause lower water quality through several mechanisms:

 Heavy rainfall can rapidly reduce the water quality in rivers and shallow groundwater. It can also have significant effects on water quality in reservoirs even if these effects can be slower. Heavy rainfalls also impact groundwater in deeper, unfractured aquifers but these impacts are less pronounced. Rainfall can cause an increase in fecal contamination of water sources. 
 Floods after heavy rainfalls can lead to mixing of floodwater with wastewater. Also, pollutants can reach water bodies by increased surface runoff.
 Groundwater quality may deteriorate due to droughts: the pollution in the rivers that feed groundwater becomes less diluted, and as groundwater levels drop, rivers may lose direct contact with groundwater.
 In coastal regions, more saltwater may mix into freshwater aquifers due to sea level rise and more intense storms. This process is called saltwater intrusion.
 Warmer water in lakes, oceans, reservoirs and rivers can lead to more eutrophication and thus more frequent harmful algal blooms. Higher temperatures are also problematic for water bodies and aquatic ecosystems because warmer water contains less oxygen.
 Permafrost thawing leads to an increased flux of contaminants.
 Increased meltwater from glaciers may release contaminants. As glaciers shrink or even disappear, the positive effect of seasonal meltwater on downstream water quality through dilution is disappearing.

Poverty 
Residents in low-income countries are at greater risk of water insecurity. This can result in human suffering, sustained poverty, constrained growth and social unrest.

Destructive forces of water 

Water can cause large-scale destruction due to its extraordinary power. The destruction can be through sudden events (for example tsunamis, floods, landslides) or through slowly progressing events (for example erosion, desertification, water pollution).

Other threats 
Other threats to water security include:

 Natural disasters such as hurricanes, earthquakes, and wildfires because they can damage man-made structures such as dams and fill waterways with debris;
 Some climate change mitigation measures which need a lot of water; for example, "bioenergy with carbon capture and storage, afforestation and reforestation may have a high water footprint if done at inappropriate locations".
 Terrorism such as water supply terrorism; 
 Radiation due to a nuclear accident; 
 New water uses such as hydraulic fracturing for energy resources;  
 Armed conflict and migration (migration can be due to water scarcity at the origin or it can lead to more water scarcity at the target destinations)

Management approaches 
There are different approaches to tackle water insecurity. Science and engineering approaches can increase the water supply or make water use more efficient. Financial and economic tools can be used as a safety net for poorer people, while heightened prices may allow for more investments in water infrastructure. Finally, management and political tools, such as demand caps, can improve water security too. Decision makers invest in institutions, information flows and infrastructure to achieve a high level of water security.

Investment decisions

Institutions 
Suitable institutions are important to improve water security. Institutions govern how decisions can promote or constrain water security outcomes for the poor. Strengthening of institutions might involve re-allocating risks and responsibilities between the state, market and communities in novel ways. This can include performance-based models, development impact bonds, or blended finance from government, donors and users. These finance mechanisms are set up to work jointly with state, private sector and communities. 

Sustainable Development Goal 16 is about peace, justice and strong institutions and recognizes that strong institutions are a necessary condition to support sustainable development, also with regards to water security.

Drinking water quality and water pollution are linked but often not addressed in a comprehensive way. For example, industrial pollution is rarely linked to drinking water quality in developing countries. River, groundwater and wastewater monitoring is important to identify sources of contamination and to guide targeted regulatory responses. WHO has described water safety plans as the most effective means of maintaining a safe supply of drinking water to the public.

Information flows 

It is important for institutions to have access to information about water because it helps them with their planning and decision-making. It also helps with monitoring policy effectiveness and accountability of all actors. For example, investments into climate information tools that are appropriate for the local context are useful. They cover a wide range of temporal and spatial scales, and respond to regional water-related climate risks.

Seasonal climate and hydrological forecasts can be useful to prepare for and reduce water security risks. They are especially useful if people can apply them at the local scale. Applying knowledge of teleconnections can improve seasonal forecasts for specific regions. Teleconnections are correlations between patterns of rainfall, temperature, and wind speed between distant areas that are caused by large-scale ocean and atmospheric circulation. 

In regions with marked seasonality and inter-annual variability for rainfall, water managers would like to have more accurate seasonal weather forecasts. In some locations the onset of seasonal rainfall is particularly hard to predict because aspects of the climate system are difficult to describe with mathematical models. For example, the long rains in East Africa which fall March to May have been difficult to simulate with climate models (when climate models work well they can produce useful seasonal forecasts). One of the reasons for these difficulties is the complex topography of the area. Improved understanding of atmospheric processes may allow climate scientists to provide more relevant and localized information to water managers on a seasonal timescale, and to provide more detailed predictions for the effects of climate change on a longer timeframe.For example, seasonal forecasts of rainfall in Ethiopia's Awash river basin may become more accurate by understanding better how sea surface temperatures in different ocean regions relate to rainfall patterns in this river basin. At a larger regional scale, a better understanding of the relationship between pressure systems in the Indian Ocean and the South Atlantic on the one hand, and wind speeds and rainfall patterns in the Greater Horn of Africa on the other hand would be helpful. This kind of scientific analysis may contribute to improved representation of this region in climate models to assist development planning. It could also guide people when they plan water allocation in the river basin or prepare emergency response plans for future events of water scarcity and flooding.

Infrastructure 
Water infrastructure serves to access, store, regulate, move and conserve water. Several assets carry out these functions. They include natural assets (lakes, rivers, wetlands, aquifers, springs) and engineered assets (bulk water management infrastructure, such as dams). Examples for infrastructure for water security include:    
 Improved water storage: using natural water storage systems (for example aquifers and wetlands) or built infrastructure (for example storage tanks and dams).
 Using new water sources to add to the existing water supplies. This can be done through water reuse, desalination, rainwater harvesting, groundwater pumping. 
 Embankments (or levee or dike) for flood protection.

The investments in infrastructure and complimentary institutions must be well balanced and are likely to evolve over time. This is important to avoid unforeseen social and environmental costs from building new infrastructure.

For example, in the case of Africa, investments into groundwater use is an option to increase water security and for climate change adaptation. Water security in African countries could benefit from the distribution of groundwater storage and recharge on the continent: many countries that have low recharge have substantial groundwater storage, whereas countries with low storage typically have high, regular recharge.

Consideration of scales 
People manage water security risks at different spatial scales: from within the household to community, town, city, basin and region. At the local scale, actors include county governments, schools, water user groups, local water providers and the private sector. At the next larger scale there are basin and national level actors. These actors help to identify any constraints with regards to policy, institutions and investments. Lastly, there are global actors such as the World Bank, UNICEF, FCDO, WHO and USAID. They help to develop suitable service delivery models.

The physical geography of a country determines the correct scale that planners should use for managing water security risks. Even within a country, the hydrologic environment may vary a lot. See for example the variety of seasonal rainfall regimes across Ethiopia.

Reducing inequalities in water security 
Inequalities with regards to water security within a society have structural and historical roots. They can affect people at different scales: from the household, to the community, town, river basin or the region. Vulnerable social groups and geographies can be identified during political debates but are often ignored. For example, water inequality is often related to gender in low-income countries: at the household level, women are often the "water managers" but have limited choices over water and related expenditures.

Improving climate resilience of water and sanitation services 

Many institutions are working to develop climate-resilient WASH services.

Measurement tools 

There is no single way to measure water security. There are no standard indicators to measure water security because it is a concept that focuses on outcomes. The specific outcomes that people regard as important can change depending on the context and stakeholders.

Instead, it is common to compare relative levels of water security by using metrics for certain aspects of water security. For example, the Global Water Security Index includes metrics on: 

 availability (water scarcity index, drought index, groundwater depletion);  
 accessibility to water services (access to sanitation and drinking water); 
 safety and quality (water quality index, global flood frequency); 
 management (World Governance Index, transboundary legal framework, transboundary political tension).

Scientists have been working on methodologies to measure water security at a variety of scales. Metrics roughly fall into two categories: those that are based on experiences versus metrics that are based on resources. The former mainly focus on measuring the water experiences of households and human well-being, while the latter tend to focus on freshwater availability or water resources security.

The Household Water Insecurity Experiences (HWISE) Scale measures several components of water insecurity at the household level: adequacy, reliability, accessibility, safety. This scale can help to identify vulnerable subpopulations, optimize resource allocation to those in need and to measure the effectiveness of water-related policies and interventions.

Global estimates 
The IPCC Sixth Assessment Report contains information on current and future water security trends: "Increasing weather and climate extreme events have exposed millions of people to acute food insecurity and reduced water security, with the largest impacts observed in many locations and/or communities in Africa, Asia, Central and South America, Small Islands and the Arctic". 

The same report predicted that "at approximately 2°C global warming level, between 0.9 and 3.9 billion people are projected to be at increased exposure to water stress, depending on regional patterns of climate change and the socio-economic scenarios considered." With regards to water scarcity (which is one parameter that contributes to water insecurity), the report states that "between 1.5 and 2.5 billion people live within areas exposed to water scarcity globally".

Water scarcity and water security are not always proportional: There are regions with high water security even though they also experience water scarcity, for example parts of the United States, Australia and Southern Europe. This is due to well-performing water services that have a high level of safety, quality, and accessibility. However, even in those regions some marginalized groups such as Indigenous peoples tend to have less access to water and face water insecurity at times.

Country examples

Bangladesh 

Water security risks in Bangladesh include: 

 natural hazards that related to the climate (climate hazards)
 some of the impacts of urbanization 
 impacts from climate change such as changes to precipitation patterns and sea level rise.

The country experiences water security risks for the capital Dhaka as well as for coastal region. In Dhaka, monsoonal pulses can lead to urban flooding which can contaminate the water supply. The following processes and events cause water risks for about 20 million people in the coastal regions: aquifers that are getting saltier, seasonal water scarcity, fecal contamination, and flooding from the monsoon and from storm surges due to cyclones.

Different types of floods occur in coastal Bangladesh. They are: river floods, tidal floods and storm surge floods due to tropical cyclones. These floods can damage drinking water infrastructure, and lead to reduced water quality as well as losses in agricultural and fishery yields. There is a correlation between water insecurity and poverty in the low-lying areas in the Ganges-Brahmaputra tidal delta plain. Those low-lying areas are embanked areas in coastal Bangladesh.

The government has various programs to reduce the vulnerability of people who live in coastal communities. These programs also create opportunities for economic development. Examples include the "Coastal Embankment Improvement Project" by World Bank in 2013, the BlueGold project in 2012, UNICEF's "Managed Aquifer Recharge" program in 2014 and the Bangladesh Delta Plan in 2014. Such investments in water security aim to improve the reliability, maintenance and operation of water infrastructure. They can help coastal communities to escape the poverty trap caused by water insecurity. 

A program called the "SafePani framework" is investigating how the government allocates risks and responsibilities between the state, the market (service providers) and communities. This program aims to help decision makers to address climate risks through a process called climate resilient water safety planning. The program is a cooperation between UNICEF and the Government of Bangladesh.

Ethiopia 

Ethiopia has two main wet seasons per year: it rains in the spring and summer. These seasonal patterns of rainfall vary a lot across the country. Western Ethiopia has a seasonal rainfall pattern that is similar to the Sahel. It has rainfall from February to November (which is decreasing to the north), and has peak rainfall from June to September. Southern Ethiopia has a rainfall pattern similar to the one in East Africa: there are two distinct wet seasons every year (February to May, and October to November). Central and eastern Ethiopia has some rainfall between February and November, with a smaller peak in rainfall from March to May, and a second higher peak in rainfall from June to September. 

In 2022 Ethiopia had "one of the most severe La Niña-induced droughts in the last forty years". It came about due to four consecutive rainy seasons which did not produce enough rain. This drought threatened the water security for more than 8 million people (pastoralists and agro-pastoralists) in the Somali, Oromia, SNNP and South-West regions. About 7.2 million people needed food aid, and 4.4 million people needed help to access water. Food prices have increased a lot due to the drought conditions. Vulnerable communities in the affected regions have experienced food insecurity as a result of water insecurity. 

In the Awash basin in central Ethiopia floods and droughts are common. Agriculture in the basin is mainly rainfed, meaning without irrigation systems (this applies to around 98% of total cropland as of 2012). Therefore, changes in rainfall patterns due to climate change will reduce economic activities in the basin. Rainfall shocks have a direct impact on agriculture. A rainfall decrease in the Awash basin could lead to a 5% decline in the basin's overall GDP. The agricultural GDP could even drop by as much as 10%.  

Partnerships with the Awash Basin Development Office (AwBDO) and the Ministry of Water, Irrigation and Electricity (MoWIE) have led to the development of a refined model of water allocation in the Awash basin. This can improve water security for the 18.3 million residents in the basin so that they always have enough water for their domestic, irrigation and industry needs.

Kenya

Kenya ranked 46th out of 54 African countries in an assessment of water security in 2022. Major water security issues in Kenya include drinking water safety, water scarcity, lack of water storage, lack of wastewater treatment, and water disaster risks such as drought and flood. Large scale climate patterns influence the rainfall patterns in East Africa. Such climate patterns include the El Niño–Southern Oscillation (ENSO) and the Indian Ocean Dipole (IOD). Cooling in the Pacific Ocean during the La Niña phase of ENSO is associated with dryer conditions in Kenya. This can lead to drought as it did in 2016 to 17. On the other hand, an unusually strong positive Indian Ocean Dipole (i.e. a warmer Western Indian Ocean) caused extreme flooding in Kenya in 2020.

Around 38% of Kenya’s population, together with 70% of Kenya's livestock, live in arid and semi-arid lands. These areas have low rainfall which varies a lot from one season to the next. This means that surface water and groundwater resources vary a lot by location and time of year. Residents in Northern Kenya are seeing increased variability in rainfall and more frequent droughts. These changes are affecting livelihoods in this region where people have been living as nomadic pastoralists. They are used to herding livestock with a seasonal migration pattern. More people are now settling in small urban centers, and there is increasing conflict over water and other resources. Water insecurity is a feature of life for both settled and nomadic pastoralists. Women and children bear the burden for fetching water.

Groundwater exploitation has considerable potential for boosting water supplies in Kenya. However, the use of groundwater is limited by poor water quality, overdrafting (pumping too much groundwater), saline intrusion along the coastal areas, and inadequate knowledge of the occurrence of the resource. On-going maintenance of groundwater infrastructure, particularly in rural areas, is another challenge.

See also 
 Global Water Security & Sanitation Partnership
 Human right to water and sanitation
 Water footprint
 Water security in Australia
 Water security in the United States

References

External links
 International Water Security Network
 Water Security (an open source journal that started in 2017)

 
Water and the environment
Security studies
Right to health